

See also 
 Lists of fossiliferous stratigraphic units in Europe

References 
 

Iceland geology-related lists
 Iceland
Paleontology in Iceland